Lutowo  is a village in the administrative district of Gmina Sępólno Krajeńskie, within Sępólno County, Kuyavian-Pomeranian Voivodeship, in north-central Poland.

The village has a population of 460.

Notable residents
 Wilhelm Reinhard (SS officer) (1869–1955)

References

Lutowo